Russ Meekins is the name of:

Russ Meekins Sr., American politician, father
Russ Meekins Jr., American politician, son